Epiphyllum chrysocardium (syn.: Selenicereus chrysocardium) is an epiphytic cactus native to Mexico, commonly called fern leaf cactus, golden heart epiphyllum, shark tooth cactus and shark fin cactus. It used to be the only species in the genus Chiapasophyllum, in addition to a former inclusion in the genus Selenicereus (commonly referred to as the fishbone, ric-rac or zig-zag cacti), but molecular phylogenetic studies show that it belongs to Epiphyllum.

References 

chrysocardium